Theater44 was a theatre in Munich, Bavaria, Germany. It opened in 1998 and was closed in May 2009.

Theatres in Munich